Visa requirements for Italian citizens are administrative entry restrictions by the authorities of other states placed on citizens of Italy. As of July 2022, Italian citizens had visa-free or visa on arrival access to 189 countries and territories, ranking the Italian passport 4th in terms of travel freedom (tied with Luxembourg and Finland) according to the Henley Passport Index. Additionally, the World Tourism Organization also published a report on 15 January 2016 ranking the Italian passport 1st in the world (tied with Denmark, Finland, Germany, Luxembourg, Singapore and the United Kingdom) in terms of travel freedom, with the mobility index of 160 (out of 215 with no visa weighted by 1, visa on arrival weighted by 0.7, eVisa by 0.5 and traditional visa weighted by 0).

Visa requirements map

Visa requirements

Territories, disputed areas or administrative subdivisions with different visa policies 
Visa requirements for Italian citizens for visits to various territories, disputed areas, partially recognized countries not mentioned in the list above, recognized administrative subdivisions that operate on different visa policies and restricted zones:

Non-ordinary passports
Holders of various categories of official Italian passports have additional visa-free access to the following countries - Algeria (diplomatic or service passports), Angola (diplomatic or service passports), Azerbaijan (diplomatic or service passports), Egypt (diplomatic, official, service or special passports), Kazakhstan (diplomatic passports), Kuwait (diplomatic passports), Libya (diplomatic, official or service passports), Niger (diplomatic passports), Qatar (diplomatic, service or special passports), Uganda (diplomatic passports), Russia (diplomatic passports) and Vietnam (diplomatic passports) . Holders of diplomatic or service passports of any country have visa-free access to Cape Verde, Ethiopia, Mali and Zimbabwe.

Right to consular protection in non-EU countries

When in a non-EU country where there is no Italian embassy Italian citizens, as EU citizens, have the right to get consular protection from the embassy of any other EU country present in that country.

See also List of diplomatic missions of Italy.

Non-visa restrictions

See also

 Italian passport
 Italian electronic identity card

References and Notes
References

Notes

Italy
Foreign relations of Italy